HMS Spark (pennant number P236) was a S-class submarine of the third batch built for the Royal Navy during World War II. She survived the war and was scrapped in 1950.

Design and description
The third batch was slightly enlarged and improved over the preceding second batch of the S-class. They displaced  on the surface and  submerged. The S-class submarines had a crew of 48 officers and ratings.

For surface running, the boats were powered by two  diesel engines, each driving one propeller shaft. When submerged each propeller was driven by a  electric motor. They could reach  on the surface and  underwater.

The boats were armed with seven 21 inch (533 mm) torpedo tubes. A half-dozen of these were in the bow and there was one external tube in the stern. They carried six reload torpedoes for the bow tubes for a grand total of thirteen torpedoes. Twelve mines could be carried in lieu of the internally stowed torpedoes. They were also armed with a 3-inch (76 mm) deck gun.

Construction and career
HMS Spark was built by Scotts, of Greenock and launched on 28 December 1943. Thus far she has been the only ship of the Royal Navy to bear the name Spark. She survived the Second World War, spending between December 1944 and July 1945 with the Eastern Fleet, arriving at Trincomalee on 21 October 1944.  She went on to sink two Japanese sailing vessels, three Japanese coasters, a barge and a tug. Another coaster was forced ashore on Panjang Island.  Spark was attacked by an enemy escort which dropped sixteen depth charges, but managed to escape damage.  She returned to the UK in October 1945. She was sold on 28 October 1949. Spark was broken up at Faslane in October 1950.

Spark acted as tow for the midget submarine XE-1, which was assigned to attack the Japanese heavy cruiser  in Singapore Harbour as part of Operation Struggle.

Notes

References
 
  
 
 
 

 

British S-class submarines (1931)
1943 ships
World War II submarines of the United Kingdom
Royal Navy ship names